
Gmina Muszyna is an urban-rural gmina (administrative district) in Nowy Sącz County, Lesser Poland Voivodeship, in southern Poland, on the Slovak border.

Villages
Apart from the town of Muszyna, Gmina Muszyna contains the villages and settlements of Andrzejówka, Dubne, Jastrzębik, Leluchów, Łopata Polska, Milik, Powroźnik, Szczawnik, Wojkowa, Żegiestów and Złockie.

Neighbouring gminas
Gmina Muszyna is bordered by the gminas of Krynica-Zdrój, Łabowa and Piwniczna-Zdrój. It also borders Slovakia.

References
Polish official population figures 2006

Muszyna
Nowy Sącz County